Dwight Ely Stone (August 2, 1886 – June 3, 1976) was a Major League Baseball pitcher.

External links

1886 births
1976 deaths
St. Louis Browns players
Kansas City Packers players
Major League Baseball pitchers
Baseball players from Nebraska
Boise Irrigators players
Ogden Canners players
Oakland Oaks (baseball) players
Memphis Chickasaws players